, born , was a Japanese singer and composer, known for his contribution to Japanese popular music called ryūkōka by his Western classical music skills. He was born in Chūō, Tokyo, and graduated from the Tokyo Music School. Although he was regarded as a tenor singer in Japanese popular music, he was originally a classical baritone singer. He also acted in various films, and was a close friend of Minoru Matsuya (1910–1995). His workroom has been reproduced inside the "NHK museum of broadcasting" as an exhibit.

Life and career
Fujiyama was born Takeo Masunaga in a store in Nihonbashi. He entered the Tokyo Music School and learned Western musical theory under German-born musician Klaus Pringsheim Sr. However, his home had the debt because of the 1923 Great Kantō earthquake.

As ryūkōka singer "Ichirō Fujiyama", he signed with Nippon Columbia, though singing ryūkōka was a taboo for his school. Meeting composer Masao Koga, he debuted with song "Camp Kouta". Fujiyama and Koga also recorded "Sake wa Namida ka Tameiki ka". The song was released and became a big hit in 1931. One theory holds that "Sake wa Namida ka Tameiki ka" sold more than one million copies.

Although Fujiyama immediately became a big star of Japan, his school was very angry and he was once forced to suspend his musical career. In 1933, he graduated from the school and signed with JVC. He released songs such as "Moeru Gojinka" and "Cheerio!" The songs were composed by Shinpei Nakayama and Kunihiko Hashimoto respectively. Further to Japanese popular songs, he sang the Western popular songs. For example, he sang "I Kiss Your Hand, Madame" under its alternative title .

He moved to Teichiku Records and then Columbia. During World War II, he also sang gunka such as "Moyuru ōzora", which was composed by Kosaku Yamada. However, he was taken prisoner in Indonesia when the war ended. After he returned to Japan, he released a string of hits such as "Aoi Sanmyaku" and "Nagasaki no Kane", which were composed by Ryoichi Hattori and Yuji Koseki respectively.

Fujiyama retired from Japanese popular music in 1954 when he moved to NHK. However, he had been known as a conductor for the Kōhaku Uta Gassen's "Hotaru no Hikari" until his death. He also composed various school songs for Japanese schools. In 1989, when Emperor Shōwa died, his song "Aoi Sanmyaku" unanticipatedly reached the top in the NHK Top 200 Japanese memorial song rankings of the Shōwa period. He was awarded the People's Honour Award in 1992 and died in 1993.

At the 60th NHK Kōhaku Uta Gassen in 2009, "Aoi Sanmyaku" was sung by NYC Boys as a part of medley  along with "NYC" and "Yūki 100%" (theme of Nintama Rantarō).

Discography 

 : 1931
 : 1931
 : 1931
 : 1932
 : 1933
 : 1933
Cheerio! : 1934
 : 1934
 : 1935
 : 1936
 : 1937
 : 1939
 : 1939
 : 1940

 : 1940
 : 1940
 : 1940
 : 1941
 : 1941
 : 1942
 : 1943
 : 1946
 : 1947
 : 1947
 : 1949
 : 1949
 : 1950
 : 1951
 : 1952
 : 1956 (as a composer)

Awards

Japanese Red Cross Society special Medal for Merit (1952)
NHK Broadcasting Culture Award (1958)
Social Education Merit Award (1959)
Medal of Honour with Purple Ribbon (1973)
Japan Record Award Special Award (1974)
Order of the Sacred Treasure, Third Class, Gold Rays with Neck Ribbon (April 29, 1982)
Golden Pheasant Award of the Scout Association of Japan (1992)
People's Honor Award (May 28, 1992)
Fourth rank in the order of precedence (August 21, 1993; posthumous)

References

External links

1911 births
1993 deaths
20th-century classical composers
20th-century conductors (music)
20th-century Japanese composers
20th-century Japanese male singers
20th-century Japanese singers
Japanese baritones
Japanese classical composers
Japanese conductors (music)
Japanese male classical composers
Nippon Columbia artists
People from Chūō, Tokyo
People's Honour Award winners
Singers from Tokyo
Teichiku Records artists
Tokyo Music School alumni